Josef Trojer was an Italian luger who competed in the 1970s. A natural track luger, he won the silver medal in the men's singles event at the 1973 FIL European Luge Natural Track Championships in Taisten, Italy.

References

Italian male lugers
Italian lugers
Possibly living people
Year of birth missing
Sportspeople from Südtirol